QAL is an open-source development project that aims to create a collection of libraries for mixing, moving, merging, substituting and transforming data; also in some cases, such as MongoDB, schemas.

Description 
Sources and destinations include different database backends, file formats like .csv, XML and spreadsheets. Even untidy HTML web pages can be used as both a source and destination.

For SQL/RDBMS backends, it has a database abstraction layer that supports basic connectivity to Postgres, MySQL / MariaDB, IBM Db2, Oracle and MS SQL Server. It uses XML formats (the SQL schema is self-generated) for representation of queries, transformation and merging, making it all processable by scripts.

With regards to SQL, QAL uses a subset of SQL features and data types, which while obviously not complete however is sufficient for most usages. It is however easy to instead use backend-specific SQL when the queries do not have to be backend-agnostic.

It is currently distributed as a Python Library (.egg) and a Debian package file (.deb).

It is related to the Optimal BPM (Business Process Management) project. The Optimal BPM SourceForge project used to be DAL/QAL.

References

External links
 QAL Documentation and examples
 API documentation

Python (programming language) libraries
Free software programmed in Python
Cross-platform free software